Christiana Boateng (born 24 February 1943, date of death unknown) was a Ghanaian sprinter. She competed in the women's 100 metres at the 1964 Summer Olympics.

References

External links
 

1943 births
Year of death missing
Athletes (track and field) at the 1964 Summer Olympics
Ghanaian female sprinters
Olympic athletes of Ghana
Athletes (track and field) at the 1962 British Empire and Commonwealth Games
Commonwealth Games competitors for Ghana
Place of birth missing
Olympic female sprinters